Glenlyon Dam, also known as Pike Creek Reservoir, is an earth and rockfill dam in Queensland near the border with New South Wales, roughly between Stanthorpe and Texas to the west.

The dam has a capacity of 254,000 megalitres, a catchment area of 1,295 square kilometres and covers an area of 1,750 hectares at full supply level.

Glenlyon Dam provides water for irrigation of grain and fodder crops. It is managed by SunWater. Swimming, fishing, boating and water skiing are all permitted, with no restrictions on boating except near the dam wall. Two boat ramps facilitate access for boating. In the upper reaches of feeder creeks there a large areas of standing timber and submerged logs.

In December 1994, the dam reached a critically low level of 2.2% and the next year rose to just 12% of capacity  during a series of droughts in Australia. The dam reached a peak of 110.78% on January 12, 2011, during the 2010-2011 Queensland floods.

Fishing 
The dam is stocked with golden perch, murray cod and silver perch while spangled perch, bony bream and eel-tailed catfish breed naturally. A Stocked Impoundment Permit is required to fish in the dam.

See also

List of dams and reservoirs in Australia

References 

Reservoirs in Queensland
Darling Downs
Dams completed in 1976
Dams in Queensland
Dams in the Murray River basin
1976 establishments in Australia